Arvo Vihtori Riihimäki (29 May 1891, Lavia - 13 December 1972) was a Finnish smallholder and politician. He was a member of the Parliament of Finland, representing the Socialist Electoral Organisation of Workers and Smallholders (STPV) from 1927 to 1930 and the Finnish People's Democratic League (SKDL) from 1945 to 1954. He was in prison for political reasons from 1930 to 1932.

References

1891 births
1972 deaths
People from Lavia, Finland
People from Turku and Pori Province (Grand Duchy of Finland)
Socialist Electoral Organisation of Workers and Smallholders politicians
Finnish People's Democratic League politicians
Members of the Parliament of Finland (1927–29)
Members of the Parliament of Finland (1929–30)
Members of the Parliament of Finland (1945–48)
Members of the Parliament of Finland (1948–51)
Members of the Parliament of Finland (1951–54)
Finnish people of World War II